Sangmu Gymnasium is an indoor sporting arena located in Seongnam, South Korea.  The capacity of the arena is 5,000 people and was built in 1986 to host wrestling events at the 1988 Summer Olympics.

References
1988 Summer Olympics official report. Volume 1. Part 1. p. 192.

Indoor arenas in South Korea
Venues of the 1988 Summer Olympics
Olympic wrestling venues
Sports venues in Gyeonggi Province
Buildings and structures in Seongnam
Korea Armed Forces Athletic Corps
Venues of the 1986 Asian Games